Vedika Sharma (born 2003) is an Indian deaf sports shooter. She made her Deaflympic debut at the age of 19 representing India at the 2021 Summer Deaflympics.

Career 
She competed at the 2021 Summer Deaflympics and clinched a bronze medal in the women's 10m air pistol shooting event with a score of 207.2 in the final.

References 

2003 births
Living people
Indian female sport shooters
Deaf sport shooters
Indian deaf people
Deaflympic shooters of India
Deaflympic bronze medalists for India
Medalists at the 2021 Summer Deaflympics
Shooters at the 2021 Summer Deaflympics
People from Uttarakhand